Mississippi elected its member August 7, 1826.

See also 
 1826 Mississippi's at-large congressional district special election
 1826 and 1827 United States House of Representatives elections
 List of United States representatives from Mississippi

1826
Mississippi
United States House of Representatives